William "Billy Batts" Bentvena (January 19, 1921 – June 11, 1970), also known as William Devino, was an Italian-American mobster with the Gambino crime family who was a longtime friend of John Gotti in the 1960s. After spending six years in prison for narcotics trafficking, Bentvena was murdered by Lucchese crime family associate Tommy DeSimone, with the help of fellow Lucchese associates James Burke and Henry Hill.

Life
Born in Brooklyn on January 19, 1921, little is known about Bentvena's early life other than that he grew up in the same area as DeSimone and Hill. In 1959, Bentvena became an associate with the Gambino crime family and in 1961 became a full member, or made man. Bentvena was a protégé street soldier for Carmine Fatico.

In May 1958, Bentvena became a member of what would become known as the Ormento Group, a heroin smuggling ring (named after John Ormento, a capo in the Lucchese crime family, the "CEO" of the group); "Managing Directors" were Carmine Galante and Anthony Mirra. On February 14, 1959, Bentvena went to Bridgeport, Connecticut, to complete a drug deal for Joseph "Joe The Crow" DelVecchio and Oreste "Ernie Boy" Abbamonte. When he arrived in Bridgeport, undercover police arrested Bentvena and charged him with possession and exchange of narcotics. Bentvena was later convicted of heroin smuggling in June 1962 alongside co-defendant  Galante and sentenced to 15 years in the Federal Correctional Institution in Danbury, Connecticut.

Murder
After his release from an eight-year prison sentence in 1970, according to the mafia memoir Wiseguy, Henry Hill describes the "welcome home" party for Bentvena at Robert's Lounge, a nightclub owned by James Burke. Bentvena jokingly asked Tommy DeSimone "if he still shined shoes", which DeSimone perceived as an insult, leaning over to Hill and Burke to say, "I'm gonna kill that fuck." Two weeks later, on June 11, 1970, Bentvena was at The Suite, Hill's nightclub in Jamaica, Queens. With the club nearly empty, DeSimone pistol-whipped Bentvena, yelling, "Shine these fucking shoes!" before beating him bloody. After Bentvena was severely beaten and presumed dead, DeSimone, Burke, and Hill placed his body in the trunk of Hill's car, stopping at DeSimone's mother's house for a knife, lime, and a shovel. Hearing sounds from the trunk, they realized that Bentvena was still alive, so DeSimone and Burke beat him to death with the shovel and a tire iron. Burke had a friend who owned a dog kennel in Upstate New York, and Bentvena was buried there. At the time of his murder in 1970, Bentvena was 49 years old and was a respected and feared soldier in the Gambino crime family.

In the 1990 movie Goodfellas, he is portrayed by actor Frank Vincent.

Aftermath
About three months after Bentvena's murder, Burke's friend sold the dog kennel to housing developers, so Burke ordered Hill and DeSimone to exhume Bentvena's corpse and dispose of it elsewhere. In Wiseguy, Hill said the body was eventually crushed in a mechanical compactor at a New Jersey junkyard, owned by Clyde Brooks. On the commentary for the film Goodfellas, he additionally states that Bentvena's body was first buried in the basement of Robert's Lounge, a bar and restaurant owned by Burke, and was at a later time indeed crushed in the compactor.

On January 14, 1979, DeSimone disappeared. It is speculated that the Gambino family ordered the death of DeSimone, a mob associate with the Lucchese crime family, for his role in the unsanctioned murder of Bentvena and Ronald "Foxy" Jerothe. Another theory is that the Gambino family did not know about the Bentvena murder and that Gambino captain John Gotti may have just wanted revenge for DeSimone's murder of Jerothe, another Gambino associate and good friend of Gotti's.

In 1980, facing a lengthy sentence for cocaine trafficking, Hill turned state's evidence and testified at the trials of both James Burke and Paul Vario. Charges were also being prepared against Burke for the murder of Bentvena, however, they did not stand legal scrutiny, as Hill claimed to be both the sole living witness as well as an accomplice.

In the 1990 Martin Scorsese film Goodfellas, the character Billy Batts (Bentvena) was portrayed by Frank Vincent. His exchange with the character Tommy DeVito (portrayed by Joe Pesci, based on Tommy DeSimone) at the welcome home party has been described as "iconic." The insult by Batts to DeVito—"Now go home and get your fucking shine box!"—has been considered among the most memorable lines in cinema history.

A photo of Philadelphia mobster Pat Spirito is commonly erroneously labelled as being of Bentvena in several media articles, Mafia sites and online forums.

References

Further reading 
Pileggi, Nicholas. Wiseguy: Life in a Mafia Family. New York: Simon & Schuster, 1985. 
Russo, Gus and Hill, Henry. Gangsters and GoodFellas: Wiseguys and Life on the Run. Mainstream Publishing, 2004.

External links
The Real Goodfella. Dir. George Simon. Narr. Richard Dillane. 2006. Channel 4 Television Corporation — via YouTube

1921 births
1970 deaths
1970 murders in the United States
Gambino crime family
Murdered American gangsters of Italian descent
Criminals from Brooklyn
Gangsters from New York City
People murdered by the Lucchese crime family
People murdered in New York City
Male murder victims